Al Mada, formerly the Société Nationale d'Investissement (SNI) is a large private Moroccan holding company mainly owned by the Moroccan royal family. Headquartered in Casablanca, the company was established in 1966. Al Mada operates in different fields such as banking, telecommunications, renewable energy businesses and food industry among others.

The conglomerate also holds stakes in the country's largest private companies: Attijariwafa Bank, Managem (mining), Nareva (energy firm), Lafarge Ciments, and Marjane (supermarket chain). Al Mada is investing in other African countries (Cameroon, Ivory Coast, Rwanda, Gabon, etc.).

The holding company used to be the majority shareholder of the now defunct ONA Group, until the activities of the latter were absorbed into the SNI and subsequently disposed of.

In 2012, the company's consolidated turnover was MAD53 billion (US$5.3 billion) and its net income was MAD5 billion (US$500 million).

History
Created in 1966, SNI has been listed on the Casablanca Stock Exchange since 1994.

In 2009, The conglomerate registered a consolidated net income of MAD2.3 billion. The company invested nearly MAD5.52 billion, mainly by acquiring 10% of Attijariwafa Bank's capital from the Spanish bank Santander.

Despite the unfavourable global context, the company's performance increased 365% in 2009, with a turnover of MAD3.42 billion, compared to the previous year.

Restructuring and merger with ONA Group 

The company planned a merger with ONA (Omnium Nord-Africain), to diversify their investments’ portfolio, in 2009. The merger was only announced by the boards of the two companies on March 26, 2010. With this merger, the group shifted from its conglomerate structure controlling the activities of its subsidiaries to an investment fund company incubating, developing and disposing of companies and projects present in the Moroccan economy. The reorganisation gave the group's subsidiaries a larger autonomy in the management of their affairs.

As a result of the SNI-ONA merger, both companies have been delisted from the Casablanca stock market, forming a new investment holding company. They later list their subsidiaries on the stock exchange market once they reach maturity growth.

According to the Casablanca Stock Exchange chief executive, Karim Hajji, the SNI-ONA merger “will improve greatly the liquidity of Casablanca bourse and spur other companies to relinquish their majority controls and sell shares to investors via the bourse."

On February 22, 2013, the group agreed to sell its stakes in Centrale Laitière (dairy firm) to French partner Danone for $727.23 million.

On November 30, 2014, the SNI appointed Hassan Ouriagli as the new CEO to replace Hassan Bouhemou.

In 2015, the net profit attributable to shareholders rose from MAD3.31 billion to MAD3.56 billion.

In 2016, the group registered a 34% rise in net profit, following the merger with Lafarge Ciments and Holcim Maroc.

Renaming to Al Mada 
On 28 March 2018, the SNI adopted its current name, Al Mada, as well as a new slogan, "Positive Impact", as it planned to expand its presence throughout the African continent.

In March 2020, Al Mada donated 2 billion dirhams to a COVID-19 emergency fund created by King Mohammed VI.

Activities and partnerships
The group has a large footprint in the Moroccan economy, estimated to be worth 3% of its GDP. It holds investments in companies holding #1 positions in banking and mass retail. Its main activities encompass financial services with Attijariwafa Bank, mass distribution with Marjane, telecommunications with Inwi and mining with Managem Group. Societe Nationale d'Investissement has invested as well in renewable energy, tourism and real estate. It has partnered as well with foreign investors such as Lafarge in Lafarge Maroc and Arcelor Mittal in Sonasid.

Partnership with Lafarge & Holcim Maroc 
In 2016, SNI partnered with Lafarge Ciment and Holcim Maroc. The partnership is composed of two separate parts: 
 The merging of Lafarge Ciments and Holcim Maroc produced LafargeHolcim Maroc, the second listed cement-manufacturers in Africa. 
 The creation of a common development subsidiary in Sub-Saharan French speaking Africa. 
This operation is beneficial for both partners as they progress towards a Pan-African investment fund. It created the first industrial market capitalization in Casablanca for an amount of MAD40 billion (EUR3.7 billion).

Partnership's implementation process:
 Merging of Holcim Maroc and Lafarge Ciment
 Assigning 50 percent to SNI of LafargeHolcim Maroc shares
 Contributing the new shares held by SNI and LafargeHolcim Maroc to Lafarge Maroc to retain the major part of the shares and control
The partnership also resulted in the creation of a common development subsidiary called LH Maroc Afrique, that targets the Sub-Saharan French speaking Africa (Burkina Faso, Ivory Coast, Gabon, Mauritania and Mali...).

Subsidiaries
Attijariwafa Bank

SNI initially held 48% stake in Attijariwafa bank. In January 2015, The conglomerate hired the Goldman Sachs and Rothschild banks to advise them on finalizing the deal of selling 19% of Attijariwafa bank to reduce SNI's debt.

Nareva

Nareva holding is fully owned by SNI and focuses on renewable and coal energy.

Cosumar

In 2013, SNI started collaborating with Cosumar only to resell the majority of its shares in 2014. In 2015, the firm completely sold the remaining shares to the stock market.

Centrale Laitière and Bimo

SNI sold its share of 37.7% in Centrale Laitiére to the French firm Danone. It also sold its 50% share of Bimo to Kraft Foods.

Lesieur Cristal

In 2014, the group sold its remaining stakes of Lesieur in a public sale.

Other Subsidiaries

Société Nationale d'Investissement (SNI) owns several other firms :
 Agma Lahlou-Tazi
 Lafarge Maroc
 Managem
 Marjane
 Nareva
 ONAPAR
 OPTORG
 SOMED 
 SONASID
 Sotherma
 Wafa Assurance
 Wafa Cash
 Wafa Capital
  (Inwi)
 Aviation unit called Africaplane

Controversy

The SNI and its former holding arm the ONA have been accused of monopolistic market practices and of corruption on several occasions. The fact that the holding's largest shareholder remains the Moroccan royal family has enabled it to exert significant political and economic pressure on its rivals and acquisition targets. A series of Wikileaks cables divulged in December 2010 revealed the reports of US diplomats casting doubts on the integrity of the dealings of the SNI (and ONA) and on the transparency of the King's business affairs.

See also
ONA Group
List of Moroccan companies

References

 01
Conglomerate companies of Morocco
Holding companies of Morocco
Mohammed VI of Morocco
Conglomerate companies established in 1966
1966 establishments in Morocco
ONA Group